Nick Spalding (born Isle of Wight, England, in 1974) is a British comedy novelist. He was educated at Cams Hill School in Fareham, and studied Media and Cultural Studies at Solent University. He worked as a media officer for the police before becoming a full time writer.

Writings 
His self-published 2012 e-books Love From Both Sides and Love And Sleepless Nights were both best-sellers. Love From Both Sides, which he describes as "a warts-and-all romantic comedy for everyone who knows how tricky the quest for love can be," sold a quarter of a million copies in 2012.

Based on that book's success he signed up with Hodder and Stoughton. His books are currently published by Amazon Publishing's Lake Union imprint. He has some self-published books still published by Notting Hill Press and is often referred to as a 'hybrid' author because of this.

Spalding has written articles for the Writers' & Artists' Yearbook and has held a writing masterclass for The Guardian.

Books 
(2013). Love Under Different Skies. Hodder & Stoughton. 
(2013). Love And Sleepless Nights. Hodder & Stoughton. 
(2013). Love From Both Sides. Hodder & Stoughton. 
(2014). Fat Chance. Amazon Publishing. 
(2015). Bricking It. Amazon Publishing. 
(2016). Mad Love. Amazon Publishing. 
(2018). Checking Out. Amazon Publishing. 
(2019). Dry Hard. Amazon Publishing. 
(2019). Dumped Actually. Amazon Publishing. 
(2020). Logging Off. Amazon Publishing. 
(2020). Going Green. Amazon Publishing. 
(2021). You Again?. Amazon Publishing. 
(2022). Third Wheel. Amazon Publishing. 
(2023). Old Boys. Amazon Publishing.

References

External links 

Hodder & Stoughton biography

1974 births
Living people
21st-century English novelists
People from the Isle of Wight
English comedy writers
Alumni of Solent University